"Woz Not Woz" is a song by Swedish house music DJs Eric Prydz and Steve Angello. The song was originally released in 2004 as a single through Cr2 Records (the London-based label's second release at the time). The song is an adaptation of "Wheel Me Out" (1980), the first single released by American group Was (Not Was). It was written by founding group members David Weiss (David Was) and Don Fagenson (Don Was).

Track listings and formats
2004 UK 12" vinyl (Cr2 Records – 12C2002)
 A. "Woz Not Woz" (Version 2) – 7:07
 B. "Woz Not Woz" (Version 1) – 8:07

2004 UK CD maxi single (Cr2 Records – CDC2002)
 1. "Woz Not Woz" (Club Mix) – 7:11
 2. "Woz Not Woz" (Dub Mix) – 8:14
 3. "Woz Not Woz" (Stringapella) – 3:06
 4. "Woz Not Woz" (Drums Tools) – 3:02

2004 France 12" vinyl (Full Force Session – FFS 003)
 A1. "Woz Not Woz" (Jerry Ropero & Denis The Menace Remix) – 10:15
 B1. "Woz Not Woz" (Sandy. W Executive Remix) – 7:13
 B2. "Woz Not Woz" (Original Club Mix) – 7:36

2005 German 12" vinyl (Alphabet City – ALPH 0042-6)
 A1. "Woz Not Woz" (Club Mix) – 7:06
 B1. "Woz Not Woz" (Abysm Remix) – 7:15
 B2. "Woz Not Woz" (Horny United Remix) – 6:26

2005 Europe CD maxi single (Alphabet City – 500.0010.3)
 1. "Woz Not Woz" (Club Radio Cut) – 3:01
 2. "Woz Not Woz" (Club Mix) – 7:08
 3. "Woz Not Woz" (Abysm Remix) – 7:15
 4. "Woz Not Woz" (Horny United Remix) – 6:26

2005 Limited Edition Collector's 12" (Cr2 Records – 12C2E002)
 A01. "Woz Not Woz" (Horny United Remix)
 A02. "Woz Not Woz" (Sandy Wilhelm Remix)
 B01. "Woz Not Woz" (Jerry Ropero & Dennis The Menace Remix)
 B02. "Woz Not Woz" (Abysm Remix)

Credits and personnel
 Writers – Eric Prydz, Steve Angello, David Weiss, Don Fagenson
 Music – David Weiss, Don Fagenson
 Lyrics – David Weiss, Don Fagenson
 Vocals – Kidz on Glass
 Label(s): Cr2 Records
 Publisher(s): EMI / Virgin Music Inc. / Microdot Songs / 1-800-DON-WAS Inc.

Credits adapted from liner notes.

Chart performance
The song first entered the UK Singles Chart at its peak the week of August 21, 2004 (preceding the release of what would later be Prydz's hit single of that year "Call on Me"), becoming the first major charting single for both artists. It achieved additional success in Europe following its re-release in 2005, particularly in France (where it was a club hit for 8 weeks) and the German-language-speaking countries of Germany, Austria, and Switzerland.

Weekly charts

Release history

References

External links
 
 Eric Prydz and Steve Angello discography at Juno Records

2004 singles
2005 singles
2004 songs
Eric Prydz songs
Songs written by Steve Angello
Songs written by David Was
Songs written by Don Was
Universal Records singles
Capitol Records singles
Songs written by Eric Prydz